Freedom Center, also known as the Chicago Tribune Publishing Center is the printing plant and headquarters for the Chicago Tribune, as well as the printing facility for other publications such as the Chicago-Sun Times.

History

Development and construction 
On June 20, 1979, the Chicago Tribune announced plans for a $150 million printing plant, to replace their former printing facility at Tribune Tower. The site was to be located in the River North district, right off of the Chicago River. Architecture firm Skidmore Owings & Merrill designed the building. The Tribune acquired the 21-acre land in 1967. The goal of completion at the beginning of the project was the fall of 1982. The building would be 697,000 sq ft, and contain 10 Goss Metroliner offset presses, with space for two more. The presses could run 75,000 papers per hour, versus 60,000 at Tribune Tower. The maximum issue would also be 144 pages an issue, versus 112 at Tribune Tower. Ground was broken on the building in September 1979.Later during construction, the anticipated price was changed to $185 Million.  On July 15 , 1981, the Chicago Tribune announced that the name of the facility would be "Freedom Center". The name was suggested by the environment editor at the time, Casey Bukro. Partial production of the facility was expected to be operational by September 1981, with full production capacity by September 1982.

Post-Construction 
Starting on July 18, 1985, Chicago Typographical Union No. 16, Chicago Web Printing Pressman's Union No. 7, and Chicago Mailers Union No. 2 all went on strike. They went on strike due to the mandatory transfer of jobs when technology made obsolete the old jobs. The unions had opposed this position. On January 4, 1986, a rally took place during the strike, and violence occurred. The violence broke out at about 5:00 AM when protesters started to throw rocks at delivery trucks leaving the plant. After police tried to use horses to separate the crowd, bricks started to be thrown. The crowd was assumed to be around 10,000 people, with 100 police present. There were 10 people with minor injuries, 35 were arrested, one Police Officer was injured, 5 Tribune employees were injured, and several delivery trucks were damaged as well.

In September 2002, a new distribution facility was opened, directly north and across the street of the main Freedom Center Building. The building's name was "Freedom Center North". It was located at 700 W Chicago. It is 115,000-square-feet big. It was closed at a unknown time.

In 2019, Freedom Center was bought by Nexstar Media as part of their wider acquisition of Tribune Media for $4.1 billion dollars. The Chicago Tribune holds a lease on the site until 2023, with two 10 year options for extension. Also included in the lease is a relocation clause, which allows for them to relocate during the lease.

In 2014, when Tribune Media split up their newspaper division in to Tribune Publishing, Tribune Media kept their real estate assets, which included Freedom Center.

In February 2019, the 37 acre site was put up for sale.

In January 2021, the Chicago Tribune moved out of One Prudential Plaza, and relocated their offices and newsroom to Freedom Center. This was only three years after their exit from Tribune Tower.

Re-development

River District 
On September 06, 2017, Tribune Media announced plans to demolish the then vacant Freedom Center North. They would turn it into a mixed-use development consisting of 1.2 million square feet of offices and a 310-unit residential building. Riverside Investment & Development were to be the developers of the project. On Apr 19, 2021, it was reported that the plans were dropped.

On October 04, 2017, Tribune Media announced plans to turn Freedom Center into a mixed-use development with 18 buildings. It would comprise about 9 million square feet of commercial and residential space. The plan aimed to be home to 19,000 jobs, and have 5,900 residential units. This development was planned to fit in with the aforementioned Freedom Center North Development. This plan was canceled after the 37 acre site was put up for sale.

Bally's Casino 
As part of the Chicago casino proposals request for proposals, Bally's Corporation proposed to put a casino on the land that Freedom Center sits on. The casino would completely demolish all buildings on the site and replace it with a $1 billion casino development. It would contain  2700 slot machines, 95 table games, a suite-only hotel, with 100 suites, and an outdoor music venue with space for 1000 people. After a 20% return on investment, Bally's proposed that they would go on to  have a $600 million expansion. There would be a total of 4000 gaming seats with the expansion, a new 400 room hotel, a 3000 seat indoor venue, and a 20,000 foot exhibition space.  On 22 March 2022, Mayor Lori Lightfoot announced that there were three finalists of the five proposals. The Bally's Freedom Center proposal was one of them. On May 5 2022, Lightfoot announced that she had chosen the Chicago Tribune Freedom Center Bally's Proposal as her selection. After receiving approval from the mayor, the proposal has to go on to receive a majority vote from the City Council and Illinois Gaming Board. The Chicago Tribune has not announced their intentions for relocation of their printing facilities and headquarters if the proposal succeeds.

Bally's purchased the Freedom Center site from Nexstar for $200 million in November 2022, and then promptly sold the property for the same price to Oak Street Real Estate Capital in a leaseback transaction.

Current uses 
Freedom Center is currently used as the headquarters and office location of the Chicago Tribune. They also print the newspapers for the Chicago Tribune there, along with other publications who rent out space. Freedom Center has a Union Pacific rail spur connected to it, which is used for newsprint delivery to the factory. Along with printing the Chicago Tribune, the press also prints the Chicago Sun-Times, the Chicago Reader, The New York Times and other publications. In 2020, when the Tribune's finances were last public, they made about 9.9% of their revenue from printing and distribution of third-party publications.

References 

Chicago Tribune
Newspaper buildings